3 Bad Men is a 1926 American silent Western film directed by John Ford. Bob Mastrangelo has called it "One of John Ford's greatest silent epics." The film possibly inspired the title for Akira Kurosawa's 1958 film Three Bad Men in a Hidden Fortress, simply known as The Hidden Fortress in the rest of the world.

Plot
A discovery of gold in the Dakotas on Sioux lands in 1877 provokes a gold land rush. Numerous people come to Custer for their chance to claim land and possibly gold when the proclamation to explore the lands goes into effect, such as singing cowboy Dan O'Malley, the Carltons, and a group of outlaws headed by "Bull" Stanley. On their way to steal a bunch of horses, the outlaws save Lee Carlton from a different sort of outlaws, who had killed her father. Instead of taking the horses for themselves, the three outlaws decide to head to Custer as her protectors. The town is plagued with corruption and injustice headed by the Sheriff Layne Hunter, who learns where gold is located and wants to find it before the others. Meanwhile, the three "bad men" decide to arrange a marriage for Lee, who soon meets up with Dan. The three outlaws must deal with that unexpected romantic attraction, along with the looming sheriff's gang and the race of wagons for gold. Dan and Lee find love with each other while the outlaws kill each other in a last stand.

Cast

Production
The film was shot over a fifteen-month period in 1925 and 1926. During the filming, three of the actresses involved, Olive Borden, Priscilla Bonner, and Grace Gordon, became ill with a form of paratyphoid fever, and had to be taken to the hospital.

The shooting locations for the film included: 
 Desert outside of Victorville, California
 The vicinity of Jackson Hole, Wyoming

References

External links

 
 

1926 films
1926 Western (genre) films
American black-and-white films
Films directed by John Ford
Fox Film films
Films shot in California
Films shot in Wyoming
Silent American Western (genre) films
1920s American films
1920s English-language films